The Syriac alphabet is a writing system primarily used to write the Syriac language since the 1st century AD. It is one of the Semitic abjads descending from the Aramaic alphabet through the Palmyrene alphabet, and shares similarities with the Phoenician, Hebrew, Arabic and Sogdian, the precursor and a direct ancestor of the traditional Mongolian scripts.

Syriac is written from right to left in horizontal lines. It is a cursive script where most—but not all—letters connect within a word. There is no letter case distinction between upper and lower case letters, though some letters change their form depending on their position within a word. Spaces separate individual words.

All 22 letters are consonants, although there are optional diacritic marks to indicate vowels and other features. In addition to the sounds of the language, the letters of the Syriac alphabet can be used to represent numbers in a system similar to Hebrew and Greek numerals.

Apart from Classical Syriac Aramaic, the alphabet has been used to write other dialects and languages. Several Christian Neo-Aramaic languages from Turoyo to the Northeastern Neo-Aramaic dialect of Suret, once vernaculars, primarily began to be written in the 19th century. The  variant specifically has recently been adapted to write Western Neo-Aramaic, traditionally written in a square Aramaic script closely related to the Hebrew alphabet. Besides Aramaic, when Arabic began to be the dominant spoken language in the Fertile Crescent after the Islamic conquest, texts were often written in Arabic using the Syriac script as knowledge of the Arabic alphabet was not yet widespread; such writings are usually called Karshuni or Garshuni. In addition to Semitic languages, Sogdian was also written with Syriac script, as well as Malayalam, which form was called Suriyani Malayalam.

Alphabet forms

Classical 

Although ʾEsṭrangēlā is no longer used as the main script for writing Syriac, it has received some revival since the 10th century. It is often used in scholarly publications (such as the Leiden University version of the Peshitta), in titles, and in inscriptions.

East Syriac 
Other names for the script include  ('conversational' or 'vernacular', often translated as 'contemporary', reflecting its use in writing modern Neo-Aramaic),  ('Assyrian', not to be confused with the traditional name for the Hebrew alphabet),  ('Chaldean'), and, inaccurately, "Nestorian" (a term that was originally used to refer to the Church of the East in the Sasanian Empire). The Eastern script resembles ʾEsṭrangēlā somewhat more closely than the Western script.

Vowels
The Eastern script uses a system of dots above and/or below letters, based on an older system, to indicate vowel sounds not found in the script:

 A dot above and a dot below a letter represent , transliterated as a or ă (called),
 Two diagonally-placed dots above a letter represent , transliterated as ā or â or å (called),
 Two diagonally-placed dots below a letter represent , transliterated as ē (called ,  or),
 The letter waw with a dot below it represents , transliterated as ū or u (called ,  or),
 The letter  with a dot above it represents , transliterated as ō or o (called ,  or),
 The letter yōḏ with a dot beneath it represents , transliterated as ī or i (called),

It is thought that the Eastern method for representing vowels influenced the development of the niqqud markings used for writing Hebrew.

In addition to the above vowel marks, transliteration of Syriac sometimes includes ə, e̊ or superscript e (or often nothing at all) to represent an original Aramaic schwa that became lost later on at some point in the development of Syriac. Some transliteration schemes find its inclusion necessary for showing spirantization or for historical reasons. Whether because its distribution is mostly predictable (usually inside a syllable-initial two-consonant cluster) or because its pronunciation was lost, both the East and the West variants of the alphabet traditionally have no sign to represent the schwa.

West Syriac 

Most of the letters are clearly derived from ʾEsṭrangēlā, but are simplified, flowing lines. A cursive chancery hand is evidenced in the earliest Syriac manuscripts, but important works were written in ʾEsṭrangēlā. From the 8th century, the simpler Serṭā style came into fashion, perhaps because of its more economical use of parchment.

Vowels
The Western script is usually vowel-pointed, with miniature Greek vowel letters above or below the letter which they follow:
 Capital alpha represents , transliterated as a or ă,
 Capital eta represents , transliterated as ī,
 A combined symbol of capital upsilon and lowercase omicron represents , transliterated as ū or u,
 Lowercase omega, used only in the vocative interjection  ('O!').

Summary table

The Syriac alphabet consists of the following letters, shown in their isolated (non-connected) forms.

Contextual forms of letters

Ligatures

Letter alterations

Matres lectionis

Three letters act as matres lectionis: rather than being a consonant, they indicate a vowel. , the first letter, represents a glottal stop, but it can also indicate a vowel, especially at the beginning or the end of a word. The letter waw is the consonant w, but can also represent the vowels o and u. Likewise, the letter  represents the consonant y, but it also stands for the vowels i and e.

In modern usage, some alterations can be made to represent phonemes not represented in classical phonology. A mark similar in appearance to a tilde (~), called majlīyānā, is placed above or below a letter in the Maḏnḥāyā variant of the alphabet to change its phonetic value (see also: Geresh):

 Added above :  to

and 
The system involves placing a single dot underneath the letter to give its 'soft' variant and a dot above the letter to give its 'hard' variant (though, in modern usage, no mark at all is usually used to indicate the 'hard' value):

The mnemonic  is often used to remember the six letters that are able to be spirantized (see also: Begadkepat).

In the East Syriac variant of the alphabet, spirantization marks are usually omitted when they interfere with vowel marks. The degree to which letters can be spirantized varies from dialect to dialect as some dialects have lost the ability for certain letters to be spirantized. For native words, spirantization depends on the letter's position within a word or syllable, location relative to other consonants and vowels, gemination, etymology, and other factors. Foreign words do not always follow the rules for spirantization.

Syriac uses two (usually) horizontal dots above a letter within a word, similar in appearance to diaeresis, called  (literally 'placings', also known in some grammars by the Hebrew name  [], 'plural'), to indicate that the word is plural. These dots, having no sound value in themselves, arose before both eastern and western vowel systems as it became necessary to mark plural forms of words, which are indistinguishable from their singular counterparts in regularly-inflected nouns. Irregular plurals also receive  even though their forms are clearly plural: e.g. ('house') and its irregular plural  ('houses'). Because of redundancy, some modern usage forgoes  points when vowel markings are present.

There are no firm rules for which letter receives ; the writer has full discretion to place them over any letter. Typically, if a word has at least one , then  are placed over the  that is nearest the end of a word (and also replace the single dot above it).

Besides plural nouns,  are also placed on:
 plural adjectives, including participles (except masculine plural adjectives/participles in the absolute state);
 the cardinal numbers 'two' and the feminine forms of 11–19, though inconsistently;
 and certain feminine plural verbs: the 3rd person feminine plural perfect and the 2nd and 3rd person feminine plural imperfect.

Syriac uses a line, called  (literally 'concealer', also known by the Latin term linea occultans in some grammars), to indicate a silent letter that can occur at the beginning or middle of a word. In Eastern Syriac, this line is diagonal and only occurs above the silent letter (e.g. In Western Syriac, this line is horizontal and can be placed above or below the letter (e.g. , 'city', pronounced , not *).

Classically,  was not used for silent letters that occurred at the end of a word (e.g.  , '[my] lord'). In modern Turoyo, however, this is not always the case (e.g.  , '[my] lord').

Latin alphabet and romanization
In the 1930s, following the state policy for minority languages of the Soviet Union, a Latin alphabet for Syriac was developed with some material promulgated. Although it did not supplant the Syriac script, the usage of the Latin script in the Syriac community has still become widespread because most of the Assyrian diaspora is in Europe and the Anglosphere, where the Latin alphabet is predominant.

In Syriac romanization, some letters are altered and would feature diacritics and macrons to indicate long vowels, schwas and diphthongs. The letters with diacritics and macrons are mostly upheld in educational or formal writing.

The Latin letters below are commonly used when it comes to transliteration from the Syriac script to Latin:

 Ā is used to denote a long "a" sound or [ɑː] as heard in "car".
 Ḏ is used to represent a voiced dental fricative [ð], the "th" sound as heard in "that".
 Ē is used to denote a long close-mid unrounded vowel, [eː].
 Ĕ is to represent an "eh" sound or [ɛ], as heard in Ninwĕ
 Ḥ represents a voiceless pharyngeal fricative ([ħ]), only upheld by Turoyo and Chaldean speakers.
 Ō represents a long "o" sound or [ɔː].
 Š is a voiceless postalveolar fricative ([ʃ]), the English digraph "sh".
 Ṣ denotes an emphatic "s" or "thick s", [sˤ].
 Ṭ is an emphatic "t", [tˤ], as heard in the word ṭla ("three").
 Ū is used to represent an "oo" sound or the close back rounded vowel [uː].

Sometimes additional letters may be used and they tend to be:

 Ḇ may be used in the transliteration of biblical Aramaic to show the voiced bilabial fricative allophone value ("v") of the letter Bēṯ.
 Ī denotes a schwa sound, usually when transliterating biblical Aramaic.
 Ḵ is utilized for the voiceless velar fricative, [x], or the "kh" sound.
 Ṯ is used to denote the "th" sound or the voiceless dental fricative, [θ].

Unicode
The Syriac alphabet was added to the Unicode Standard in September, 1999 with the release of version 3.0.
Additional letters for Suriyani Malayalam were added in June, 2017 with the release of version 10.0.

Blocks

The Unicode block for Syriac is U+0700–U+074F:

The Syriac Abbreviation (a type of overline) can be represented with a special control character called the Syriac Abbreviation Mark (U+070F).

The Unicode block for Suriyani Malayalam specific letters is called the Syriac Supplement block and is U+0860–U+086F:

HTML code table
Note: HTML numeric character references can be in decimal format (&#DDDD;) or hexadecimal format (&#xHHHH;). For example, &#1813; and &#x0715; (1813 in decimal) both represent U+0715 SYRIAC LETTER DALATH.



Vowels and unique characters

See also
 Abjad
 Alphabet
 Aramaic alphabet
 Aramaic language
 Mandaic language
 Mongolian script
 Sogdian alphabet
 Syriac language
 Syriac Malayalam
 Old Uyghur alphabet
 History of the alphabet
 List of writing systems

Notes

References

Sources
 Coakley, J. F. (2002). Robinson's Paradigms and Exercises in Syriac Grammar (5th ed.). Oxford University Press. .
 Hatch, William (1946). An Album of Dated Syriac Manuscripts. Boston: The American Academy of Arts and Sciences, reprinted in 2002 by Gorgias Press. .
 Kiraz, George (2015). The Syriac Dot: a Short History. Piscataway, NJ: Gorgias Press. .
 Michaelis, Ioannis Davidis (1784). Grammatica Syriaca.
 Nestle, Eberhard (1888). Syrische Grammatik mit Litteratur, Chrestomathie und Glossar. Berlin: H. Reuther's Verlagsbuchhandlung. [translated to English as Syriac grammar with bibliography, chrestomathy and glossary, by R. S. Kennedy. London: Williams & Norgate 1889].
 Nöldeke, Theodor and Julius Euting (1880). Kurzgefasste syrische Grammatik. Leipzig: T.O. Weigel. [translated to English as Compendious Syriac Grammar, by James A. Crichton. London: Williams & Norgate 1904. 2003 edition: ].
 Phillips, George (1866). A Syriac Grammar. Cambridge: Deighton, Bell, & Co.; London: Bell & Daldy.
 Robinson, Theodore Henry (1915). Paradigms and Exercises in Syriac Grammar. Oxford University Press. .
 Rudder, Joshua. Learn to Write Aramaic: A Step-by-Step Approach to the Historical & Modern Scripts. n.p.: CreateSpace Independent Publishing Platform, 2011. 220 pp.  Includes the Estrangela (pp. 59–113), Madnhaya (pp. 191–206), and the Western Serto (pp. 173–190) scripts.
 Segal, J. B. (1953). The Diacritical Point and the Accents in Syriac. Oxford University Press, reprinted in 2003 by Gorgias Press. .
 Thackston, Wheeler M. (1999). Introduction to Syriac. Bethesda, MD: Ibex Publishers, Inc. .

External links

 The Syriac alphabet at Omniglot.com
 The Syriac alphabet at Ancientscripts.com
 Unicode Entity Codes for the Syriac Script
 Meltho Fonts for Syriac
 How to write Aramaic – learn the Syriac cursive scripts
 Aramaic and Syriac handwriting   (classical)
 Learn Assyrian (Syriac-Aramaic) OnLine  (eastern)
 GNU FreeFont Unicode font family with Syriac range in its sans-serif face.
 Learn Syriac Latin Alphabet on Wikiversity

 
Tur Abdin
Right-to-left writing systems
Abjad writing systems